George Allan Martin (27 July 1883 – 25 November 1964) was an Australian rules footballer who played for Melbourne in the Victorian Football League (VFL).

References

1883 births
Melbourne Football Club players
Australian rules footballers from Victoria (Australia)
1964 deaths